The molecular formula C8H12N4 (molar mass: 164.21 g/mol, exact mass: 164.1062 u) may refer to:

 Azobisisobutyronitrile (AIBN)
 1-(2-Pyrimidinyl)piperazine (1-PP or 1-PmP)

Molecular formulas